Chinta Mohan (born 19 November 1954) was a member of the 14th Lok Sabha of India. He represented the Tirupathi constituency of Andhra Pradesh and is a member of the Indian National Congress.

External links
 Official biographical sketch in Parliament of India website

Indian National Congress politicians from Andhra Pradesh
India MPs 2004–2009
1954 births
Living people
India MPs 2009–2014
People from Chittoor district
Lok Sabha members from Andhra Pradesh
India MPs 1984–1989
India MPs 1989–1991
India MPs 1991–1996
India MPs 1998–1999
United Progressive Alliance candidates in the 2014 Indian general election